Pearl Alice Marsh worked as Senior Professional Staff for Africa on the House Committee on Foreign Affairs. She was the first African-American woman to receive a doctorate degree in Political Science from the University of California, Berkeley. She served as Director of U.S. Policy and Global Health at the ONE Campaign.

References

Date of birth missing (living people)
Living people
University of California, Berkeley alumni
Year of birth missing (living people)